Live at the Target is a live album released by the British neo-progressive band Twelfth Night in 1981.

Details
Shortly after the release of Early Material, singer Electra McLeod left Twelfth Night (or was asked to leave), leaving the band with a new release featuring a vocalist, but without a vocalist for concerts. Live at the Target was recorded to re-establish the band as an instrumental unit. For the first time, a Twelfth Night recording was released on vinyl.

As the title suggests, it is a live recording, made at The Target, a now closed pub built under the Butts Centre in their home town of Reading.

The Cyclops re-issue of Live at the Target contains "Encore Une Fois" and "Freddie Hepburn" from The First Tape Album and "Afghan Red" from Early Material.

The "Definitive Edition" is a 2 x CD expanded version consisting of the original album and live material, including two rare studio tracks.

Track listing
All songs written by Twelfth Night.
 "Für Helene Part I" (6:46)
 "After the Eclipse" (7:31) 
 "East to West" (10:36) 
 "Sequences" (19:56)

2004 reissue includes the above plus

 "Afghan Red" (12:16)
 "Freddie Hepburn" (8:45)
 "Encore Une Fois" (6:46)

Definitive Edition Reissue
Live at the Target is the third of the Twelfth Night "definitive edition" releases and was released 6 January 2012

Disc One
  "Für Helene I" (6:56)
 "After the Eclipse" (7:53) 
 "East to West" (10:55)
 "Sequences" (20:10)
Recorded 15–16 January 1981, The Target, Reading
 
Disc Two
  "Entropy" (14:23) - Old Five Bells, Northampton, 29 March 1981 
 "Keep the Aspidistra Flying" (8:00) - Old Five Bells, Northampton, 29 March 1981
 "Encore Une Fois" (6:04) - Bridgehouse, Bracknell, 12 April 1980 
 "(Hats Off To) Freddie Hepburn" (8:42) - Bridgehouse, Bracknell, 12 April 1980
 "Afghan Single" (3:54) - Woodcray Manor Farm Studios, Wokingham, 25 May 1981 
 "Für Helene I" (5:11) - Arny's Shack, Bournemouth, August 1980
 "The Cunning Man" (6:14) - Reading University, 27 June 1980
 "Afghan Red" (11:25) - The Target, Reading, 21 November 1980
 "Für Helene II" (12:33) - Reading University, 13 November 1979

Previously unreleased tracks

Personnel
Brian Devoil drums, percussion 
Clive Mitten bass, keyboards, classical guitar 
Andy Revell electric and acoustic guitar
Rick Battersby keyboards

External links
 Twelfth Night Official Website

Twelfth Night (band) albums
1981 live albums